This article is the Electoral history of Stephen Harper, the twenty-second prime minister of Canada. Harper served as prime minister from February 6, 2006 to November 4, 2015, having won three general elections.

A conservative, Harper was unsuccessful in his first general election as leader of the Conservative Party, which re-elected then-Prime Minister Paul Martin and the Liberals.  However, two years later Harper defeated Martin in the general election of 2006 and formed a minority government.  Harper was re-elected with a minority government in 2008, and then a majority government in the election of 2011.

Harper was defeated in the 2015 general election by Justin Trudeau, who succeeded him as prime minister.  His successor as leader of the Conservative Party was Andrew Scheer.

Harper stood for election to the House of Commons eight times, first for the Reform Party, then for the Canadian Alliance, and finally for the Conservative Party.  He was defeated on his first attempt, but elected the next seven times.

Harper took a break from electoral politics from 1998 to 2002, when he was the President of the National Citizens Coalition.

Following the 2015 general election defeat, Harper resigned as leader of the Conservative Party. He retired from politics in 2016.

Summary 

Harper ranks sixth out of twenty-three prime ministers for time in office, serving as prime minister for nine years, 271 days.  He is the third Conservative to win three elections, following Sir John A. Macdonald and John Diefenbaker, and the second-longest serving Conservative prime minister, after Macdonald.

Harper was the third prime minister from Alberta, the others being R. B. Bennett and Joe Clark.

Harper was originally from Ontario and a Liberal Party supporter, but in his early twenties he moved to Alberta.  He became involved in Progressive Conservative politics and then gradually in the formation of the new Reform Party, working as Reform's chief policy officer.  He served one term as a Reform Member of Parliament, but then resigned to become the president of the National Citizens Coalition (1998-2002).

In 2002, Harper was elected leader of the Canadian Alliance, the successor to the Reform Party, and began merger talks with the Progressive Conservative party, known as the Unite the Right movement.  After the merger was achieved, he became the first leader of the new Conservative Party of Canada, and led the party in the 2004 general election.  Although defeated by Prime Minister Paul Martin and the Liberal Party, Harper and the Conservatives become the Official Opposition.  Two years later, Harper and the Conservatives won the 2006 general election, forming a minority government.  Harper successfully led the Conservative Party in the next two elections, being returned with a minority government in 2008, and then with a majority government in 2011.  He was defeated by the Liberals led by Justin Trudeau in the 2015 general election.  On election night, he announced he would be resigning as leader of the Conservative Party.

Harper stood for election to the House of Commons eight times, all in Alberta ridings.  He was unsuccessful in his first election (1988), but was elected the next five times (four general elections and one by-election).

Following his resignation as Conservative leader, Harper sat as a Conservative back-bencher in the Commons. In 2016, he resigned his seat and retired from politics.

Federal general elections: 2004 to 2015 

Harper led the Conservative Party in five general elections.  He won three (2006, 2008 and 2011) and lost two (2004 and 2015). He won two minority governments in the 2006 and 2008 elections, and a majority government in the 2011 election. He lost the 2015 election to Justin Trudeau.

Federal general election: 2004 

In his first general election as a party leader, Harper reduced Martin's government from a majority to a minority government. Harper retained his position as Leader of the Official Opposition.

1 Prime Minister when election was called;  Prime Minister after election.
2 Leader of the Opposition when election was called;  Leader of the Opposition after the election.
3 Table does not include parties which received votes but did not elect any members.

Federal general election: 2006 

In his second general election, Harper defeated Prime Minister Martin and formed a minority government.

1 Leader of the Opposition when election was called;  Prime Minister after election.
2 Prime Minister when election was called;  Member of Parliament after the election.
3 Table does not include parties which received votes but did not elect any members.

Federal general election: 2008 

In his third general election, Harper was re-elected with a minority government, defeating the new Liberal leader, Stéphane Dion.

1 Prime Minister when election was called;  Prime Minister after election.
2 Leader of the Opposition when election was called;  Leader of the Opposition after the election.
3 Table does not include parties which received votes but did not elect any members.

Federal general election: 2011 

In his fourth general election, Harper was re-elected with a majority government, defeating the new Liberal leader, Michael Ignatieff.

1 Prime Minister when election was called;  Prime Minister after election.
2 Leader of a third party when election was called;  Leader of the Opposition after the election.
3 Leader of the Opposition when election was called;  not a Member of Parliament after the election. 
4 Table does not include parties which received votes but did not elect any members.

Federal general election: 2015 

In his fifth general election, Harper was defeated by the new Liberal leader, Justin Trudeau, who formed a majority government.

1 Leader of a third party when election was called;  Prime Minister after election.
2 Prime Minister when election was called;  Member of Parliament after the election.
3 Leader of the Opposition when election was called; leader of a third party  after the election. 
4 Table does not include parties which received votes but did not elect any members.

Federal constituency elections:  1988, 1993;  2002 to 2015 

Harper stood for election to the House of Commons eight times.  He was defeated the first time, in the general election of 1988, but was elected the next seven times (six general elections and one by-election).

1988 Federal Election: Calgary West 

 Elected. 
X Incumbent. 
1  Rounding error.

1993 Federal Election: Calgary West 

 Elected. 
X Incumbent. 
1  Rounding error.

2002 Federal By-Election: Calgary Southwest 

The by-election was called following the resignation of the incumbent, Preston Manning, the former leader of the Reform Party, to give Harper, recently elected leader of the Alliance, an opportunity to enter the House of Commons.

 Elected.

2004 Federal Election: Calgary Southwest 

 Elected. 
X Incumbent.

2006 Federal Election: Calgary Southwest 

 Elected. 
X Incumbent. 
1 Rounding error.

2008 Federal Election: Calgary Southwest 

 Elected. 
X Incumbent. 
1 Rounding error.

2011 Federal Election: Calgary Southwest 

 Elected. 
X Incumbent. 
1 Rounding error.

Note:  the electoral district was abolished in 2015.

2015 Federal Election: Calgary Heritage 

 Elected. 
X Incumbent. 
1 Rounding error.

Note:  Harper resigned his seat on August 26, 2016.

Leadership elections 

Harper participated in two leadership contests:  the leadership of the Canadian Alliance in 2002, and the leadership of the Conservative Party of Canada in 2004.  He won both contests.

2002 Canadian Alliance leadership election 

Stockwell Day had been elected leader of the new Canadian Alliance in 2000, but his leadership triggered a caucus revolt and a new leadership vote.  Every member of the party had a right to vote by mail-in ballot.  Harper won on the first ballot.

2004 Conservative Party leadership election 

The Canadian Alliance and the Progressive Conservative parties merged in December 2003.  In March, 2004, the party held its first leadership election.  The vote was based on the 308 Conservative riding associations.  Each riding association had 100 points.  All party members had the right to vote through their riding associations, and each riding association's points were allocated in proportion to the local vote.

1 Rounding error.

See also 

 Electoral history of Paul Martin - Harper's principal opponent in two general elections and predecessor as Prime Minister.
 Electoral history of Justin Trudeau - Harper's successor as Prime Minister.

References

External links 

 Library of Parliament:  History of Federal Ridings since 1867

Harper, Stephen